Chaverina is a rural locality (a village) in Leninskoye Rural Settlement, Kudymkarsky District, Perm Krai, Russia. The population was 9 as of 2010.

Geography 
Chaverina is located 36 km south of Kudymkar (the district's administrative centre) by road. Leninsk is the nearest rural locality.

References 

Rural localities in Kudymkarsky District